Sportsklubben Brage is a defunct Norwegian multi-sports club from Trondheim.

History
It was founded on 24 March 1907. its sports included football, athletics, boxing and Nordic skiing. It was disbanded in 2009.

Athletics
Arne Halse won an Olympic silver and bronze in 1908, and also competed in 1906 and 1912. Other Olympic athletes are John Johansen (1908), Otto Osen (1912) and Otto Monsen (1912; represented Hamar TF in 1908). Hjalmar Johannesen also represented the club for some years.

Football
The men's football team played in the 1937–38 League of Norway, 1938–39 League of Norway, 1939–40 League of Norway, 1947–48 League of Norway and the 1959–60 Norwegian Main League.

Boxing
The club was represented in the 1920 Olympics by boxers Aage Steen and Johan Sæterhaug.

References

Defunct athletics clubs in Norway
Defunct football clubs in Norway
Sport in Trondheim
Sports clubs established in 1907
1907 establishments in Norway
Sports clubs disestablished in 2009
2009 disestablishments in Norway